A dysostosis is a disorder of the development of bone, in particular affecting ossification. Examples include craniofacial dysostosis, Klippel–Feil syndrome, and Rubinstein–Taybi syndrome.

It is one of the two categories of constitutional disorders of bone (the other being osteochondrodysplasia). When the disorder involves the joint between two bones, the term synostosis is often used.

References

External links 

Congenital disorders of musculoskeletal system